Verrall v Great Yarmouth BC [1981] QB 202 is a land and contract law case on the arbitrary revocation of an agreed, future licence in land for good consideration.

It also determined whether the remedy of specific performance was available to the claimant, who succeeded in the action and as respondent against the Council's appeal or whether damages would be a more appropriate remedy.  It decided that ordering specific performance was appropriate.

Facts
Great Yarmouth Borough Council agreed to rent out the Wellington Pier Pavilion in April 1979 to the National Front for its two-day national conference in October. Then Labour won the balance of control on the council in May insisting the new administration revoke the NF's licence. Verrall, the party's deputy chairman, sued on his own behalf and for the NF members for performance of the contract.

Judgment
Lord Denning MR held that the contract had to be upheld, and was specifically enforceable. Since the case of Winter Garden Theatre Ltd v Millennium Ltd he said, ‘it is clear that once a man has entered under his contract of licence, he cannot be turned out. An injunction can be obtained against the licensor to prevent his being turned out.’

Cases applied
Winter Garden Theatre (London) Ltd v Millennium Productions Ltd [1948] AC 173, UKHL (E)

Cases distinguished
Thompson v Park [1944] KB 408, CA

See also

English property law
English contract law

References

English land case law
Court of Appeal (England and Wales) cases
1981 in case law
1981 in British law